Nikola Zhelyazkov Dimitrov (born 30 October 1968) is a Bulgarian wrestler. He competed in the men's Greco-Roman 57 kg at the 1992 Summer Olympics.

References

1968 births
Living people
Bulgarian male sport wrestlers
Olympic wrestlers of Bulgaria
Wrestlers at the 1992 Summer Olympics
Place of birth missing (living people)